Eimmart may refer to:
 Eimmart (crater), a lunar crater
 Georg Christoph Eimmart (1638–1705), German draughtsman and engraver
 Maria Clara Eimmart 1676–1707), German astronomer, engraver, and designer